Citizens (shortened as Cs—C's until January 2017), officially Citizens–Party of the Citizenry (Ciudadanos–Partido de la Ciudadanía), is a liberal political party in Spain.

Founded in Catalonia in 2006, the party received 25.4% of votes and 36 deputies in the December 2017 Catalan regional election, making it the largest single party in the Parliament of Catalonia. Nevertheless, it has never taken power so its actual political stance remains a source of debate between supporters and adversaries, beyond a  strong opposition to Catalan nationalism and the Catalan independence movement. The party used the phrase "Catalonia is my homeland, Spain is my country and Europe is our future" to outline the ideology which the party self-describes as postnationalist. In spite of that, it has been deemed by a variety of sources to profess a populist Spanish nationalist ideology. The party has also been described as conservative-liberal, populist,  and pro-European.

Citizens used to present itself as a centre-left party that offered social-democratic and progressive-liberal positions in its platform, but it dropped any mention of social democracy from its principles in February 2017 and by 2018 was judged by some to have experienced a further swing to the right, as it began to compete with the PP, and later also with Vox, to become the leading right-of-centre party in the country. It has recently been described by media and CIS (a Spanish public research institute) as right-oriented.

Their party popularity collapsed after a poor performance in the November 2019 Spanish general election, and further after a failed attempt in Murcia to overthrow the regional government via an unexpected no confidence vote, losing all its seats in the Assembly of Madrid and the Parliament of Andalusia, 30 of its 36 seats in the Parliament of Catalonia and all but one seat in the Cortes of Castile and León.

History 
Citizens was formed in Catalonia in July 2006 in response to the call made in a manifesto by a group of well-known figures in Catalan civic society (among them Albert Boadella, Félix de Azúa, Francesc de Carreras and Arcadi Espada) in which they called for a new political force to "address the real problems faced by the general public". In this manifesto, they also warned that "the rhetoric of hatred promulgated by official Catalan government media against everything Spanish is more alarming than ever" and that "the (Catalan) nation, promoted as an homogenous entity, has taken over the space where an undeniably diverse society lived".

In July 2005, this group of personalities, almost entirely based in Barcelona, formed a political platform called Ciutadans de Catalunya, or Citizens of Catalonia. They organised several round tables and conferences and by 2006 they had announced the formation of a new political party. In their first conference of 2006, Albert Rivera, a young lawyer from Barcelona, was elected president.

In the 2006 elections for the Parliament of Catalonia, Cs won 3% of the votes and returned three MPs. In the 2010 elections, a similar result was achieved (3.4%, 3 MPs). Mainly as a counter to the growing public support for independence in Catalonia, Cs has since further grown substantially in support as one of the most outspoken opponents of this movement. In the 2012 snap elections, the number of votes more than doubled (7.6%, 9 MPs). All but one of these seats were in the Province of Barcelona. In the 2015 elections, Cs more than doubled its votes again (17.9%, 25 MPs), becoming the second largest faction in the Catalan parliament.

In 2013, the party started organising in the rest of Spain with a manifesto called "La conjura de Goya" ("Confederacy of Goya") that took place in the Congress Palace of Madrid. In the 2015 general elections, Cs entered parliament with 13.9% and 40 seats. As PP's Mariano Rajoy refused the mandate to form a government, Cs promised the second-largest party PSOE support in parliament in exchange for a number of political concessions. However, this pact would have needed the support of Podemos and finally did not gain a parliamentarian majority, paving the way for a repeat election. In the 2016 snap elections, Cs lost 0.8% of the popular vote and 8 seats due to Spain's electoral system. After these elections, Cs could strike a deal with the conservative PP in supporting its government in exchange for a number of political concessions. After a 10-month political deadlock, PP leader Mariano Rajoy was able to become Prime Minister thanks to Cs support and an abstention of PSOE.

In the 2014 European elections, the party received 3.16% of the national vote and elected two MEPs. Both MEPs joined the Alliance of Liberals and Democrats for Europe (ALDE) group. In the 2019 European elections the party obtained 12% of the vote, and won a total of 7 MEPs (which, post-brexit, has become 8 MEPs).

The party was accepted into the Alliance of Liberals and Democrats for Europe Party on 4 June 2016.

Rivera resigned as party president on 11 November 2019 after the party lost 80% of its seats in the November 2019 general election. He was succeeded by Inés Arrimadas.

In March 2021, Ciudadanos, together with Spanish Socialist Workers' Party, presented a surprise no confidence motion in the Region of Murcia against the regional coalition government of the People's Party and Ciudadanos. The motion failed due to defection of several Ciudadanos deputies, and triggered a "political earthquake" across the country, leading to a number of high-ranking members abandoning the party. In the aftermath, Cs also lost all its 26 deputies in Madrid in the 2021 Madrilenian regional election, and fell in country-wide polls from ~7% support (~10 deputies) down to ~3% (~1 deputy).

Ideology 

At first, Citizens branded itself as a centre-left party in its statement of principles (ideario). While Rivera refused to locate Citizens on the political spectrum for a time, he later placed Cs in the political centre. Although some observers agreed with the party's ideario by describing Cs as centre-left and others agree with Rivera's last definition by describing the party as centrist, the vast majority of them have positioned Citizens on the centre-right. In a 2014 interview, Congress spokesman Juan Carlos Girauta explicitly stated that he did not perceive any significant differences between Citizens, the centrist Union, Progress and Democracy and the far-right Spanish nationalist party Vox. Federico Finchelstein identifies Citizens with a light brand of "neo-liberal populism".

Official stance 
Ideologically, Cs describes itself as a progressive, secular, constitutional, European federalist and postnationalist political party. Ciudadanos rejects the autonomous communities' right to self-determination outside of the Spanish state. As an originally Catalan party, it specifically opposes Catalan nationalism due to viewing it as an outdated, authoritarian and socially divisive ideology which fuels hatred among both Catalans and Spaniards. Rivera uses the phrase "Catalonia is my homeland, Spain is my country and Europe is our future" to describe the party's ideology.

The party opposes separatist movements such as the Catalan independence movement and federating the autonomous communities. Even though Citizens is currently a supporter of European federalism, it ran in the 2009 European Parliament election in coalition with the pan-European, Eurosceptic party Libertas. Although reconsidering the current head of state is not a priority for the party, Rivera has said that Citizens is "a republican party which claims that Spanish citizens are who have to decide whether they prefer a once-modernized monarchy or a republic through a referendum in the context of a constitutional reform".

According to its declared identity signs, Cs advocates four basic lines of action:
 Defence of individual rights
 Defence of social rights as well as the welfare state
 Uphold the State of Autonomies and Europe's unity
 Regeneration of democracy and of political life

Main tenets 

Cs displays a political discourse mainly centered around opposition to Catalan nationalism, to the extent that it has been frequently criticised for being a single issue party, a label rejected by its members. In the 2006–2012 period, the number of Cs voters who had voted for centre-right parties in previous elections was similar to the number who had voted for centre-left parties, suggesting that the party's positions on general economic and social issues are not its main draw. Cs criticises any sort of nationalism, "including the Spanish nationalism that Mr. Ynestrillas defends".

One of the main issues raised by the party is the Catalan language policy which actively promotes the use of Catalan language as the sole working language of Catalan public administration. The party challenges this policy and defends equal treatment of the Spanish and Catalan languages. It also opposes the current language policy within the Catalan educational system in accordance with which all public schooling is delivered in Catalan. The party also supports strengthening the powers of the Spanish central institutions and curtailing the powers of regional administrations.

Other topics include a thorough reform of the electoral system with the aim of creating greater proportionality that would give less weight to single constituencies. They also support some changes in the 1978 Constitution, especially regarding regional organisation. Regarding the chartered autonomous communities' tax regimes, the party respects and does not want to remove the Basque Country's and Navarre's chartered regimes because it believes that "they aren't discriminatory in and of themselves". However, it criticises what it calls the miscalculation of the quota or contribution which is negotiated between governments and has been causing significant differences that they regard as having become outrageous. It proposes a review and a recalculation of the Basque and Navarrese Economic Agreements in order to stop the Basque Country and Navarre being "net beneficiaries". Among other policies, they also support legalisation of marijuana, euthanasia, and gestational surrogacy.

Prominent meetings of the party have been reportedly picketed by Catalan separatist groups on several occasions. Its leader Albert Rivera has received anonymous death threats urging him to quit politics. Two members of the ERC Youth were sentenced to prison for it. Members of Ciudadanos have repeatedly taken part in violent attacks on Catalan targets and far-right and ultranationalist groups are usually present in their demonstrations. In one instance, a Telemadrid cameraman was assaulted, allegedly because he was mistaken for a member of Catalan broadcaster TV3.

Policies 

The Cs outlined some policies for the 2015 general election:
 Lower corporation tax to 25%
 Lower and harmonise VAT to a rate between 16% and 19%
 Cap the top-rate of income tax at 40%
 Increase research and development spending to 3% of GDP
 Abolish or merge municipalities with a population of less than 5,000
 Reduce bureaucracy and red tape
 More transparent party funding
 Crack down on corruption
 Reform or abolish the Senate.
 Instate an earned income tax credit to fight in-work poverty
 "Austrian Backpack" transferable unemployment compensation where a worker accumulates funds throughout their career which are accessible upon job loss or retirement
 Devolve training to the citizens from employers associations and trade unions
 Ease immigration policies to attract talent and investors
 Legalize marijuana

Spanish nationalism 
Although the party defines itself as postnationalist, it has been deemed by a variety of sources (including peer-reviewed expert texts) to profess a populist Spanish nationalist ideology. In a party conference held on 20 May 2018 to present its platform España Ciudadana, Rivera said in a hall filled with Spanish flags:
I do not see reds and blues, I see Spaniards. I do not see, as they say, urban people and rural people, I see Spaniards. I do not see young or old, I see Spaniards. I do not see workers and entrepreneurs, I see Spaniards. I do not see believers or agnostics, I see Spaniards. [...] So, compatriots, with Citizens, let's go for that Spain, let's feel proud of being Spaniards again.

Controversy

Alternative views and past membership 
In 2006, the newspaper El Periódico de Catalunya revealed that Rivera was a card-carrying member of the conservative People's Party (PP) between 2002 and 2006 and that he had left the PP only three months before running for election for the Citizen's Party. This was corroborated by El Mundo and El País. Despite these revelations, Rivera denied having been a full member of PP and implied that he had voted for the PSOE until recently. Past PP membership is common among Cs members. Former PSC activist Juan Carlos Girauta had joined the PP and became a prolific contributor to conservative journalism from his Libertad Digital column before becoming a Citizens member and candidate in the 2014 European election. During his long tenure as Libertad Digital columnist and COPE debater, Girauta expressed strong sympathies for right-wing Zionism (to the point of calling then-President Zapatero an antisemite) and lent credibility  to the now discredited book by Victor Farías dismissing socialist politician Salvador Allende as a racist and a social Darwinist, without clarifying that the quotations about genetic determinism in Allende's doctoral dissertation were themselves quotations from other authors (mostly Cesare Lombroso) or the fact that Allende was highly critical of these conclusions in his thesis which was later published as a rebuttal to Farías' position. Farías was later sued for this, but Girauta never retracted his statements.

In 2015, a member of the Citizens electoral list for Gijón to the city council and regional elections posted pro-Falangist, pro-Blue Division and pro-Hitler Youth messages on Facebook. Those same elections carried news of at least five other former card-carrying Falange and/or España 2000 members.

An altercation took place in Canet de Mar on 21 Ma, 2018 between pro-independence local residents, who had planted yellow crosses on the beach to honor imprisoned and fugitive politicians; and anti-independence individuals who decided to remove said crosses. The altercation left at least three people wounded, including an 82-year-old man and a local CUP councilor who explicitly accused Citizens and Falange militants from across the whole region to be among the provocateurs. Citizens Member of Parliament Carlos Carrizosa dismissed the claim that either "councillors or party activists" from the party were involved in the incidents. Four days later and despite admonishments and warnings by President of the Parliament Roger Torrent, Carrizosa himself removed a yellow ribbon from the seats reserved for absent Cabinet ministers, forcing the President to suspend the entire session.

Relations with the media 
During the 2006 Catalan election campaign, the party's president Albert Rivera appeared completely naked in a poster in order to attract publicity to the party. In the beginning, the party frequently complained about an alleged boycott on the part of Catalan media. In their opinion, the party was given too little airtime to present its views on the Catalan public television.

2009 European election internal dispute 
In 2009, it was announced that Cs would run for the European election allied with the Libertas coalition. The party's association with Declan Ganley's Libertas platform raised some concern on account of the coalition formed by the latter with nationalist and ultranationalist parties in each of its local European chapters, seemingly at odds with the professed ideology of Cs.

Several intellectuals that had participated in the formation of Ciutadans later withdrew their support. For instance, Albert Boadella, became one of the co-founders of the Union, Progress and Democracy (UPyD) party led by former Basque Socialist politician Rosa Díez.

According to some members of Cs, the negotiations prior to this electoral pact were led personally and secretly by the party leader Albert Rivera. This alienated the other two MPs (besides Rivera himself) and a significant part of the party from his leadership. In turn, the official stance of Cs is that the critics are using the dispute as a pretext to canvass support for the ideologically similar UPyD.

Position in the political spectrum 
On June 24, 2019, the party's economics spokesman, Toni Roldán, announced that he was leaving Citizens and renouncing his seat in the Spanish parliament in protest at the party’s drift to the right and its willingness to enter alliances with the far right after regional and municipal elections. Following Roldán's resignation, MEP Javier Nart and the Asturian leader Juan Vázquez stepped down as well, leaving their political offices in the party's committee and the Asturian Parliament, respectively.

Some days later, Francesc de Carreras, one of the party's founders, and Francisco de la Torre, MP and economist, also announced that they would leave the party due to its stances against the PSOE and in favor of alliances with the far-right.

This crisis came after the President of France Emmanuel Macron's government sent a warning to Citizens, which his En Marche! party is in a group with in the EU Parliament, over far-right ties.

Funding 
A credit was requested for party funding in 2015 to Banco Popular Español, up to 2017 an IBEX 35 member.

In 2017, the Court of Audit found irregularities in the accounting books of several political groups, Citizens among them. In respect of Citizens, the irregularities included illegal expenses for advertising on local television in 2015.

Cs member Jorge Soler appeared in December 2017 on the TV3 debate Preguntes Freqüents, during which journalist  addressed him about the 2.1 million euros spent by Cs in the 21-D Catalan election campaign—higher than the budget spent by any other party on that election. Talegón inquired about the sources of this funding. Soler replied that this ample budget could be ascribed to the austerity of their party.

European representation
In the European Parliament, Ciudadanos sits in the Renew Europe group with six MEPs.

Electoral performance

Cortes Generales

European Parliament

Regional parliaments

Results timeline

Notes

References

Bibliography 
 
 
 
  Published online.

External links 

 Official website 

 
Webarchive template wayback links
2006 establishments in Spain
Centrist parties in Spain
Liberal parties in Spain
Libertas.eu
Political parties established in 2006
Political parties in Catalonia
Republican parties in Spain
Alliance of Liberals and Democrats for Europe Party member parties
Conservative liberal parties